"Realty Bites" is the ninth episode of the ninth season of the American animated television series The Simpsons. It originally aired on the Fox Network in the United States on December 7, 1997. The episode sees Marge becoming a real estate agent, while Homer enjoys Snake's car. It was written by Dan Greaney and directed by Swinton O. Scott III.

This episode has the final speaking appearance of Lionel Hutz, five months before the death of Phil Hartman. The episode's development grew out of a desire by the writers to do a show focused on Marge, where her job did not work out.

The episode received positive mention in the book I Can't Believe It's a Bigger and Better Updated Unofficial Simpsons Guide and is featured in the special 2003 DVD release The Simpsons: Risky Business.

Plot
After Marge complains about the family spending their weekends idly at home, Homer drags her to a police seized-property auction. While there, he buys Snake's car, the Li'l Bandit. Upon seeing this, Snake vows to kill Homer. After the auction, insisting on walking home rather than ride in Homer's new dangerous hotrod, Marge encounters Lionel Hutz, who has become a realtor. Marge decides to try the job for herself and begins to work for Hutz at Red Blazer Realty. She tells prospective buyers her honest opinion about the houses she shows them, which prevents her from selling any homes. Hutz informs her to use more positive descriptions when selling the houses, and also informs Marge if she does not sell a house in the first week, she will be fired. Marge tries to bend the truth but fails as she just cannot lie to others. Marge does not disclose the entire truth of the house she sells to Ned Flanders and his family, which had been the site of a multiple homicide, a property which Red Blazer Realty had hitherto been unable to sell. The Flanders purchase the house and bid farewell to the Simpsons.

Meanwhile, Snake escapes from the prison and jumps into the Li'l Bandit to retrieve the car from Homer. They start fighting each other to gain control of the moving car, and Chief Wiggum starts chasing them.

Feeling guilty about her deception and concerned for the Flanders' safety, Marge goes to check on them at their new house. There, she tells them the truth about the murders, but they are not upset. Ned and Maude are pleased to be a part of Springfield's history, and refuse Marge's offer of returning the deposit. However, the house is destroyed seconds later when Li'l Bandit and Wiggum's police car crash through the house. Marge returns Ned's down payment. Hutz, furious at the destruction costs and especially by the return of the money, fires Marge (giving her a Red Blazer embroidered with this information). At the end of the episode, Homer takes Marge to the government unemployment office to collect a welfare check.

Production
The writers wanted to do a "Marge episode", but one where her job does not work out, unlike previous episodes. The episode marks the first appearance of Gil Gunderson, voiced by Dan Castellaneta, and Cookie Kwan, voiced by Tress MacNeille. Excuses were made by the writers to bring back Gil in future episodes based on Castellaneta's performance at the table read, which proved popular with the staff. Snake's prison number is 7F20, the production code of "The War of the Simpsons", the episode in which he first appeared.

The piano wire scene was meant to end with Kirk's sandwich being sliced just the way he wanted, until George Meyer suggested that his arm be cut off instead. Mike Scully described the ensuing laughter at his suggestion as the most intense he had ever heard from the staff, saying: "They were literally choking because the joke was so unexpected. It was a shocked kind of laugh, and it just started rolling, one of those laughs that build the more they reverberate through you." In the unemployment line, the unemployment recipient with the bucket hat and the beard is a caricature of George Meyer. Due to Phil Hartman's death, the recurring characters of Lionel Hutz and Troy McClure were retired. As such, this episode is the last speaking appearance of Lionel Hutz, with him only being featured as a background character in some future episodes. Troy McClure's final appearance would be in "Bart the Mother", the third episode of season ten.

Cultural references

The title of the episode is an allusion to the 1994 movie Reality Bites. Gil Gunderson is based on Jack Lemmon's portrayal of Shelley Levene in the 1992 film Glengarry Glen Ross.

When Homer drives by Snake for the first time in the convertible he sings, "My name is Luka, and I live on the second floor." The lyrics are from the hit song "Luka" by Suzanne Vega.

At one point in the episode, Snake sets up a wire across a road to decapitate Homer as he drives by. The wire is supplied by "Acme", after the brand of equipment used by Wile E. Coyote to try and stop Road Runner in the Looney Tunes cartoons.

When Ned Flanders explains to Marge that they were painting Todd's room red, Todd starts saying "Red room, red room" and moves his finger, like the character of Danny does in the film The Shining.

Lionel Hutz reading the list of wrecked items to Marge is a tribute to the Lethal Weapon movies.

The newspaper front page reporting the "Jealous Jockey Murders" carries the statement "Mrs. Astor safe" beneath the headline. This is a reference to the front page of The New York Times on April 15, 1912, reporting the sinking of the RMS Titanic three days earlier whilst assuring that "Ismay safe, Mrs. Astor maybe".

Reception
In its original broadcast, "Realty Bites" finished 21st in ratings for the week of December 1–7, 1997, with a Nielsen rating of 10.8, equivalent to approximately 10.6 million viewing households. It was the third-highest-rated show on the Fox network that week, following The X-Files and King of the Hill.

The authors of the book I Can't Believe It's a Bigger and Better Updated Unofficial Simpsons Guide said, "A simple but enjoyable romp, with the final few minutes in the Murder House particularly funny. Best thing though is the introduction of the hapless Gil, destined to always be a ray of light in any episode!"

The episode is featured in a special 2003 DVD compilation called The Simpsons: Risky Business, along with "Marge Gets a Job", "Deep Space Homer", and "Homer the Smithers".

References

External links

The Simpsons (season 9) episodes
1997 American television episodes